Wheatland Township is one of eighteen townships in Carroll County, Iowa, USA.  As of the 2000 census, its population was 728.

Geography
According to the USGS, it contains one cemetery, Wheatland.

References

External links
 US-Counties.com
 City-Data.com

Townships in Carroll County, Iowa
Townships in Iowa